This is a comprehensive discography of Face to Face, a Southern California-based punk rock band. The band has released eleven full-length studio albums (counting a covers album), eight EPs, two split albums, one official live recording, one compilation album, eleven music videos and twelve singles. This list is not intended to include material performed by members or former members of Face to Face that was recorded with Legion of Doom, Me First and the Gimme Gimmes, No Use for a Name, The Offspring, Pulley, Saves the Day, 22 Jacks, Viva Death, Red Faced, or Real Space Noise.

Biography
Face to Face traces its beginnings back to 1988 when singer/guitarist Trever Keith, bassist Matt Riddle, and drummer Rob Kurth formed a local metal band called Zero Tolerance. After forming, Kurth's friend Mark Haake joined the group in 1989 as an additional guitarist for a couple of months before getting orders to the Middle East with the Air Force. Although no formal studio recordings of Zero Tolerance exist, they had recorded a handful of demo tapes. As a three-piece, the band played a show at Spanky's in Riverside, California, and a couple of other local shows. When Haake left, the band continued as a three-piece and changed their name to Face to Face in 1991.

In late 1991, Face to Face were signed to a local punk rock record label Dr. Strange Records. Dr. Strange issued the band's first single "No Authority" and their first studio album Don't Turn Away, which was released in 1992. Copies of Don't Turn Away sold quickly and Dr. Strange was unable to keep up with the demand, so Keith contacted NOFX's Fat Mike of Fat Wreck Chords to re-release it with wider distribution. In addition to re-releasing the album, Fat Wreck Chords released "Disconnected" as a 7" single in August 1993. Also in 1993, just after a three-week tour in Germany supporting their labelmates Lagwagon, Face to Face added Chad Yaro as an additional guitarist. Before the band could begin work on Don't Turn Away'''s follow-up, they made a decision to go with a new label that had major-label distribution. The label, Victory Music,signed them and then they entered the studio with producer Thom Wilson (of The Offspring fame) and began recording their second album, entitled Big Choice. The label was nervous about their distribution deal and wanted a test release to run through the system, and issued an EP of songs from 7"s and other rarities called Over It.

A&M Records signed the band and re-released Big Choice in 1995, yielding a minor hit on the L.A. local radio station KROQ with the re-recording of "Disconnected". After touring with bands such as NOFX, The Mighty Mighty Bosstones, and The Offspring during 1995, Riddle left Face to Face and went on to play in 22 Jacks and Pulley before settling on No Use for a Name. The band replaced Riddle with a then-unknown bassist named Scott Shiflett. Face to Face returned to the studio in 1996 to record another album for their label, resulting in their self-titled fourth album, which was a moderate success. To promote the album, the band joined the Warped Tour in 1997.

After promoting the self-titled album, longtime drummer Rob Kurth left the band in early 1998. To finish out the touring cycle for the self-titled album, the band replaced Kurth with Jose Medeles, who was out with them on a co-headlining US tour with the Reverend Horton Heat band, before taking a break to write and record their next album. After 25 different drummers were auditioned to replace Kurth, the band finally found Pete Parada. After the release of two more albums, Ignorance Is Bliss (1999) and Reactionary (2000), Yaro departed from Face to Face in 2001. Instead of hiring a replacement for him, the band decided to continue as a three piece.

After the release of one more album, How to Ruin Everything (2002), Face to Face decided to call it quits, and embarked on a farewell tour in 2004. The band released a holiday song "Merry Xmas" on the 2004 Kevin and Bean album Christmastime in the 909. After breaking up, Keith had been active in the mashup group Legion of Doom, among other bands such as Shiflett's brainchild Viva Death and a solo project called Pablum. Yaro had been missing from the public eye after his 2001 departure from Face to Face. After leaving Saves the Day, Parada joined The Offspring in 2007, replacing Atom Willard, During the recording of their new studio album at the time. 

After a four-year hiatus, Face to Face reunited in January 2008 for select shows in the US and internationally. In April of that year, they performed together for the first time since breaking up at The Glasshouse in Pomona, California, and have continued to perform numerous live venues since. The band released Laugh Now, Laugh Later'', their first album in 9 years, on May 17, 2011.

Studio albums

Live albums

EPs

Compilation albums

Singles

References

Face to Face discography
Discographies of American artists